Preinitiation complex can refer to:
 Transcription preinitiation complex
 Translation preinitiation complex